Austin William "Goose" Gonsoulin (June 7, 1938 – September 8, 2014) was an American professional football player who was a safety in the American Football League (AFL) for the Denver Broncos and in the National Football League (NFL) for the San Francisco 49ers.  Gonsoulin played college football at Baylor University.

At the end of his stint with the Broncos, he was the AFL's all-time leader in interceptions with 40.  He made the first interception ever in the AFL, in the first league game against the Boston Patriots.  He had seven interceptions in his first three games, and his 11 pickoffs in 1960 are still a Denver club record.  He shares the team record for interceptions in a game with four, a feat he accomplished September 18, 1960 at Buffalo.

Gonsoulin was a Sporting News AFL All-League player in 1960, 1962, and 1963, and an AFL Western Division All-Star in 1961, 1964 and 1966.  His amazing durability and toughness enabled him to start 61 consecutive games at one point in his career.  He was also the captain of his college team at Baylor.  Gonsoulin was selected to the second unit of the American Football League All-Time Team.

Gonsoulin died on September 8, 2014.

See also
 List of American Football League players

References

1938 births
2014 deaths
American football safeties
Baylor Bears football players
Denver Broncos (AFL) players
San Francisco 49ers players
American Football League All-League players
American Football League All-Star players
American Football League All-Time Team
Sportspeople from Port Arthur, Texas
Players of American football from Texas